Waldron is an unincorporated community in southwestern Platte County, Missouri in the United States. Waldron is located on the edge of the Missouri River floodplain approximately one mile southeast of Route 45. I-435 crosses the Missouri River 2.5 miles south of the community. The Burlington Northern Railroad passes the community. It is within the Kansas City metropolitan area.

History
Waldron was laid out in 1869 by J. M. and M. H. Waldron, and named for them. A post office called Waldron has been in operation since 1869.

References

Unincorporated communities in Platte County, Missouri
Unincorporated communities in Missouri